The 2009 Chattanooga Mocs football team represented the University of Tennessee at Chattanooga as a member of the Southern Conference (SoCon) in the 2009 NCAA Division I FCS football season. The Mocs were led by first-year head coach Russ Huesman and played their home games at Finley Stadium. They finished the season 6–5 overall and 4–4 in SoCon play to place fourth.

Schedule

References

Chattanooga
Chattanooga Mocs football seasons
Chattanooga Mocs football